Gilles Gaetner (born 11 January 1946 in Paris) is a French journalist and the author of several books. He became a journalist at L'Express in 1992.

References

Living people
French male journalists
1946 births
Writers from Paris
20th-century French journalists